The "Lands of the Hungarian Crown" was the titular expression of Hungarian pretensions to the various territories that the King of Hungary ruled nominally or absolutely.

They are distinct from the Lands of the Crown of Saint Stephen, which denominates the Lands of the Hungarian Crown as a constituent part of the territory of Austria-Hungary during the totality of the subordination of Hungary to Austria-Hungary, from 30 March 1867 to 16 November 1918. Therefore the Lands of the Hungarian Crown constituted part of the later Lands of the Crown of Saint Stephen (from 1867 to 1918).

Middle Ages

St. King Ladislaus I used the title of "King of Slavonia" in 1091 (?).

In 1102, during the reign of King Coloman of Hungary, the Kingdom of Croatia entered a dynastic union with the Kingdom of Hungary, and thereby Croatia became an autonomous kingdom within it, thus subject to the Hungarian Crown. Therefore successive Hungarian kings bore the additional title of "King of Croatia and Dalmatia".

In 1136, King Béla II invaded Bosnia for the first time and initiated the long enduring effort in attempt to subjugate Bosnia to the Hungarian Crown. Although it was a part of the Hungarian Crown Lands, the Banate of Bosnia was a de facto independent state for much of its history.

In 1137, King Béla II assumed the title of "King of Rama" ("Rex Ramae") to signify his rule of Bosnia, "Rama" being the name of a river in Bosnia, and his successors were also so styled. King Béla II also instituted the inferior title of "Duke of Bosnia" as an honorary title for his adult son, later King Ladislaus II.

After Stefan Nemanja and his son Vukan Nemanjić swore fealty to King Emeric, he assumed the title of King of Serbia ("Rex Serviae") in 1202. 

The Principality of Halych was annexed to the Lands of the Hungarian Crown during the reign of King Andrew II, who adopted the title of "King of Galicia". Successive kings usually bore the alternative title of "King of Lodomeria and Galicia", "Lodomeria" denominating the city of Volodymyr-Volynskyi (contemporarily in Ukraine).

Béla IV of Hungary began expansionist politics towards Cumania. He promoted Christian missions among the pagan Cumans who dwelled in the plains south of the Carpathians. In 1228, he established the Diocese of Cumania which was initially under the jurisdiction of the Archbishopric of Esztergom. Local chieftains acknowledged his suzerainty and he adopted the title of King of Cumania ("Rex Cumaniae") in 1233.

King Stephen V conquered territory in Bulgaria, received its local nobles as his vassals, and thereafter bore the title of "King of Bulgaria".

The birth of the three regna

Between 1526 and 1541 Hungary disintegrated into three parts. From the 16th century, Hungary proper, Croatia and Transylvania were the three regna of the Crown. These lands had some links with each other but became more and more autonomous during the centuries.

In the 18th century, the Lands of the Hungarian Crown consisted of the Kingdom of Hungary, the Kingdom of Croatia and the Kingdom of Slavonia with the city of Fiume, the Grand Principality of Transylvania, the Croatian Military Frontier, the Slavonian Military Frontier, and the Serbian-Hungarian military frontiers.

Galicia was acquired by the Habsburgs in the name of the Hungarian Crown, however it was not attached to Hungary.

During the Hungarian Revolution of 1848 the Hungarian government proclaimed in the April Laws of 1848 that Transylvania became fully integrated into Hungary, however, after the fall of the revolution, the March Constitution of Austria defined that the Principality of Transylvania as being a separate crown land that is entirely independent of Hungary.

In 1867, the Crown's two regna Transylvania and Hungary were reunited in the process of the creation of Austria-Hungary, however Kingdom of Croatia-Slavonia kept and improved its position as an autonomous realm within the Lands of the Crown of Saint Stephen. In 1881 Croatian and Slavonian military frontiers were abolished and united with Croatia-Slavonia.

After World War I, Transylvania was ceded to Romania and Croatia (with Slavonia) formed the State of Slovenes, Croats and Serbs (on 1 December 1918 it united with the Kingdom of Serbia to form the Kingdom of Serbs, Croats and  Slovenes). The city of Fiume became short lived Free State of Fiume until 1924 when it was ceded to Italy. Territories of south-Hungarian counties in Banat, Bácska and Baranya (the west of Temes County, Torontál County, Bács-Bodrog County and Baranya County) as a Province of Banat, Bačka and Baranja became part of  the Kingdom of Serbs, Croats and Slovenes.

Literature

References

Kingdom of Hungary
H